Trailinga Swami (also Tailang Swami, Telang Swami) (reportedly 27 November 1607– 26 December 1887), whose monastic name was Swami Ganapati Saraswati, was a Hindu yogi and mystic famed for his spiritual powers who lived in Varanasi, India. He is a legendary figure in Bengal, with stories told of his yogic powers and longevity. According to some accounts, Trailinga Swami lived to be 280 years old, residing at Varanasi between 1737 and 1887. He is regarded by devotees as an incarnation of Shiva. Sri Ramakrishna referred to him as "The walking Shiva of Varanasi".

Early life 
Trailanga Swami was born in Kumbilapuram (now known as Kumili of Pusapatirega) at Vijayanagaram District in Andhra Pradesh, with the name of Shivarama. According to his disciple biographer, Shivarama was born in 1607 CE, corresponding to year 1529 of the Shaka era. His biography has been written by Biruduraju Ramaraju as one volume of his six volume project Āndhra yōgulu.

Shivarama's parents, Narasimha Rao and Vidyavati Devi, who were devotees of Shiva. After the death of his father in 1647, at the age of 40, he gave up wealth and family responsibilities to his half brother Sridhar. His mother then shared with him the fact that her father at the time of death expressed desire to be born to her and continue his Kali sadhana for the benefit of mankind. She told Shivarama that she believed that he was her father (his own grandfather) reincarnated and that he should take up Kali sadhana. Upon the initiation of a Kali mantra from his mother, Shivarama carried out Kali sadhana in the nearby Kali temple and Punya Kshetras, but was never far away from his mother. After his mother's death in 1669, he saved her ashes (chita bhasma). He would wear her ashes and continue his Kali sadhana day and night (teevra sadhana). During that time, Shivarama lived the life of a recluse in a cottage, built by his half-brother, near a cremation ground. After 20 years of spiritual practice (sadhana), he met his preceptor swami, Bhagirathananda Saraswati, in 1679 from the Punjab. Bhagirathananda initiated Shivarama into monastic vows (sannyasa) and named him Swami Ganapati Saraswati in 1685. Ganapati reportedly led a life of severe austerities and went on a pilgrimage, reaching Prayag in 1733, before finally settling in Varanasi in 1737.

Varanasi 

A member of the Dashanami order, Shivarama became known as Trailanga Swami after he settled in Varanasi, living the monastic life.

Trailanga Swami had conquered the Ashta Siddhis - he is supposed to have walked on water and performed many more such extraordinary feats.

In Varanasi, till his death in 1887, he lived at different places including Assi Ghat, the Veda-Vyasashrama at Hanuman Ghat, Dashashwamedh Ghat. He was often found roaming the streets or the ghats, stark naked and "carefree as a child". He was reportedly seen swimming or floating on the river Ganges for hours. He talked very little and at times not at all. A number of people became attracted to him upon hearing of his yogic powers to ameliorate their sufferings. During his stay in Varanasi, several prominent contemporary Bengalis known as saints met and described him, including Lokenath Brahmachari, Benimadhava Brahmachari, Bhagaban Ganguly, Ramakrishna, Vivekananda, Mahendranath Gupta, Lahiri Mahasaya, and Swami Abhedananda., Premananda Bhaskarananda, Vishuddhananda, and Vijaykrishna. and Sadhak Bamakhepa .

After seeing Trailanga, Ramakrishna said, "I saw that the universal Lord Himself was using his body as a vehicle for manifestation. He was in an exalted state of knowledge. There was no body-consciousness in him. Sand there became so hot in the sun that no one could set foot on it. But he lay comfortably on it." Ramakrishna also stated that Trailanga was a real paramahansa (lit:"Supreme swan", used as an honorific for a spiritual teacher) and that "all Benares was illuminated by his stay there."

A true Raja-yogi, he practised intense Raja-yoga and Sattvic-Rajasic forms of Tantra.

Trailanga had taken the vow of non-seeking (ayachaka)—remaining satisfied with whatever he received. In the later stage of his life, as his fame spread, crowds of pilgrims visited him. During his last days, he took up living like a python (ajagaravritti) in which he sat still without any movement, and devotees poured water (abhisheka) on him from early morning till noon, looking upon him as a living incarnation of Shiva.

Death 
Trailanga died on Monday evening, 26 December 1887. His body was given salilasamadhi in the Ganges, according to the funeral customs of the monks of the Dashanami sect, in the presence of mourning devotees standing on the ghats.

Legends and stories 
There are many stories told about Trailanga and his spiritual powers, such that he has become a near mythical figure in India. Robert Arnett writes that his miracles are "well documented" and "he displayed miraculous powers that cannot be dismissed as myth" and that there were living witnesses to his "amazing feats". Trailanga was believed to have lived to be around 300 years. One account said that he could "read people’s minds like books."

On many occasions, Trailanga was seen to drink deadly poisons with no ill effect. In one instance, a skeptic wanted to expose him as a fraud. The monk was accustomed to breaking his long fasts with buckets of clabbered milk (buttermilk), so the skeptic brought him a bucket of calcium-lime mixture used for whitewashing walls instead. The monk drank the entire bucket with no ill effect—instead, the skeptic fell to the ground writhing in pain. The monk broke his usual silence to explain the law of karma, of cause and effect.

According to another story, Trailanga often walked around without any clothes, much like the naga (or "sky-clad", naked) sadhus. The Varanasi police were scandalized by his behaviour, and had him locked in a jail cell. He was soon seen on the prison roof, in all his "sky-clad" glory. The police put him back into his locked cell, only to see him appear again on the jail roof. They soon gave up, and let him again walk the streets of Varanasi.

Thousands of people reportedly saw him levitating in a sitting position on the surface of the river Ganges for days at a time. He would also apparently disappear under the waves for long periods, and reappear unharmed. Sivananda Saraswati attributed some of his miracles to the siddhi or yogic power Bhoothajaya – conquest over the five elements: "Fire will not burn such a Yogi. Water will not drown him."

With respect to his reportedly yogic powers, miracles abound in Trailanga's biographies and exceptionally long life. Swami Medhasananda writes that according to the "science of yoga", attainment of these is not "impossible".

It is also said that Trailanga is same as Kuzhandaiananda Swamigal of south India who has Samadhis at Madurai, Tenkasi and Batalagundu.

Teachings 

Trailanga's teachings are still extant and available in a biography by Umacharan Mukhopadhyay (1849-1900),one of Trailanga's foremost disciples. Trailanga described bondage as "attachment to the world" and liberation as "renunciation of the world and absorption in God." He further said that after attaining the state of desirelessness, "this world is transformed into heaven" and one can be liberated from samsara (the Hindu belief that life is a cycle of birth and death) through "spiritual knowledge". According to Trailanga, that attachment to the "evanescent" world is "our chronic disease" and the medicine is "detachment".

Trailanga described man's senses as his enemy and his controlled senses as his friend. His description of a poor person as one who is "very greedy" and regarded one who always remains content as rich. He said that the greatest place of pilgrimage is "Our own pure mind" and instructs people to follow the "Vedantic truth from the Guru." He described a sadhu as one who is free from attachment and delusion. One who has transcended the egoself.

Notes

References

Further reading

External links 
 "A Boatman's story" in Yoga Journal.
 Tattwananda The Saints of India
The Life of Trailanga Swami (Bengali, full movie)

 

1887 deaths
17th-century Hindu religious leaders
18th-century Hindu religious leaders
19th-century Hindu religious leaders
Advaitin philosophers
Longevity myths
Hindu revivalists
Indian Hindu yogis
Indian Hindu monks
Indian Shaivites
People from Vizianagaram
Scholars from Andhra Pradesh
Telugu people
17th-century Indian philosophers
Indian Hindu saints